Baek Ji-eun (born 5 January 1988) is a South Korean basketball player for Bucheon KEB Hana Bank and the South Korean national team.

She participated at the 2018 FIBA Women's Basketball World Cup.

References

1988 births
Living people
Forwards (basketball)
South Korean women's basketball players